Marty is a surname. Notable people with the surname include:

 Alexandre Marty (1894-1918), French flying ace
 André Edouard Marty (1882–1974), French graphic artist
 André Marty (1886–1956), French communist and political commissar of the International Brigades during the Spanish Civil War (1936–1939)
 Anton Marty (1847–1914), Swiss-born Austrian philosopher
 Dick Marty (born 1945), Swiss politician
 François Marty (1904–1994), former Cardinal and Archbishop of Paris
 Frédéric Marty (1911–1940), French mathematician
 John Marty (born 1956), member of the Minnesota Senate
 Mickey Marty (1922–2013), American basketball player

Fictional people
 Emilia Marty, a central character in the play The Makropulos Affair by Karel Čapek and the opera based upon it by Leoš Janáček